Sir Walter Russell Crocker  (25 March 190214 November 2002) was an Australian diplomat, writer and war veteran.

Life and career
Crocker was born in Broken Hill, New South Wales, the eldest son of Robert Crocker and Alma Bray. He served in World War II with the British Army, becoming a lieutenant colonel.

He was ambassador or high commissioner to eleven countries, including India (twice), Indonesia, Canada, Italy, Belgium, Nepal, the Netherlands, Ethiopia, Kenya and Uganda.

Crocker was a Lieutenant-Governor of South Australia for more than nine years. He and his wife, Claire, had two sons, Robert and Christopher.

Books
Crocker authored a well-received biography of Jawaharlal Nehru titled Nehru: A Contemporary's Estimate (1966).

Awards
Crocker was made a Commander of the Order of the British Empire in 1955 while Australian Ambassador to Indonesia. He was later promoted to Knight Commander of the Order of the British Empire (KBE) in 1977, in recognition of his service to the public.

References

Further reading

Nehru: A Contemporary's Estimate by Walter Crocker with a Foreword by Arnold Toynbee (1966). New York: Oxford University Press.

External links 

 The Memoirs of Sir Walter Crocker held at Churchill Archives Centre, Cambridge

1902 births
2002 deaths
Australian Knights Commander of the Order of the British Empire
Ambassadors of Australia to Indonesia
Ambassadors of Australia to Italy
Ambassadors of Australia to Ethiopia
Ambassadors of Australia to Belgium
Ambassadors of Australia to the Netherlands
High Commissioners of Australia to India
Ambassadors of Australia to Nepal
High Commissioners of Australia to Canada
High Commissioners of Australia to Kenya
High Commissioners of Australia to Uganda
Australian centenarians
Men centenarians
Lieutenant-Governors of South Australia